"A Man Without Love" was the  entry in the Eurovision Song Contest 1966, performed in English by Kenneth McKellar.

The song is a ballad, with McKellar comparing a man without love and a man with love. He explains that a man without love is "only half a man, this nothing", and a man "with love is everything in life".

At Eurovision
It was performed eighteenth and last on the night, following 's Dickie Rock with "Come Back to Stay". At the close of voting, it had received eight points (five from Ireland and three from Luxembourg), placing ninth in a field of 18 (the worst placing for the United Kingdom until ).

It was succeeded as British representative at the 1967 contest by Sandie Shaw with "Puppet on a String".

Charts
"A Man Without Love" peaked at No. 30 in the UK Singles Chart in March 1966.

References

Eurovision songs of the United Kingdom
Eurovision songs of 1966
Songs written by Peter Callander
Decca Records singles
1966 songs